The city of Chicago, Illinois, includes a large Bosnian population. The largest concentration of Bosnians in Chicago lives on the North Side.

History
The first Bosnians settled in Chicago in the late 19th and early 20th centuries, joining other immigrants seeking better opportunities and better lives. As the former Yugoslavia continued to find its identity as a nation over the last century, the people of Bosnia and Herzegovina sought stability and new beginnings in the city of Chicago, with many intending to return to their homeland.

The Bosnian Muslim community received a new influx of migrants after World War II who were displaced by the war and Communist takeover. As the population increased in the early 1950s, the community invited Sheik Kamil Avdich to become the first permanent imam (religious minister). Under Imam Kamil's leadership, the Muslim Religious and Cultural Home was established to raise funds for a mosque, which opened on Halsted Street in 1957. In 1968, the organization's name was changed to the Bosnian American Cultural Association, and in the early 1970s it purchased land in Northbrook to build a larger mosque and cultural center. The Islamic Cultural Center of Greater Chicago has remained an important center for Muslim religious activity, serving Bosnian and non-Bosnian Muslims in the Chicago metropolitan area.

Demographics
Approximately 40,000 Bosnians came as refugees from the Bosnian War during the 1990s and early 2000s.

Religion
Bosnian immigrants during the early 1900s established the first mosque in the city.

Bosnian Muslims were early leaders in the establishment of Chicago's Muslim community. In 1906, they established Dzemijetul Hajrije (The Benevolent Society) of Illinois to preserve the community's religious and national traditions as well as to provide mutual assistance for funerals and illness. The organization established chapters in Gary, Indiana, in 1913, and Butte, Montana, in 1916, and is the oldest existing Muslim organization in the United States.

References

External links

 Chicago Festival Of Bosnian-Herzegovinian Film

Bosnian-American culture in Illinois
Bosnian-American history
European-American culture in Chicago
Ethnic groups in Chicago